Maurice A. FitzGerald (January 9, 1897 – August 25, 1951) was a Democratic politician from Queens, New York City.

Life
FitzGerald was born in Brooklyn, New York in 1897. By the age of 14 he began working as a postal clerk. He soon moved to South Ozone Park, Queens and became involved in southern Queens civic organizations by the 1920s.

He was a member of the New York State Assembly (Queens Co., 5th D.) in 1929, 1930, 1931, 1932, 1933, 1934, 1935, 1936 and 1937.

He was elected sheriff of Queens County in 1937, then named the Borough Public Works Commissioner in 1942. In 1949, he was elected Borough President of Queens. He did not live to the end of his first term, dying of a heart attack while vacationing in Star Lake, New York in 1951. He is interred at St. John's Cemetery in Middle Village, Queens.

Maurice A. FitzGerald Playground in South Ozone Park, and Public School No. 199 (Maurice A. FitzGerald School) in Sunnyside, Queens, commemorate the former borough president.

References 

 Maurice A. FitzGerald at the Political Graveyard

1897 births
1951 deaths
Queens borough presidents
Democratic Party members of the New York State Assembly
Sheriffs of Queens County, New York
20th-century American politicians
People from Ozone Park, Queens